The 1923 PGA Championship was the sixth PGA Championship, held September 24–29 in New York at Pelham Country Club in Pelham Manor, Westchester County. The field of 64 qualified by sectional tournaments, and competed in six rounds of match play, all at 36 holes in a single-elimination tournament.

In the final match on Saturday, defending champion Gene Sarazen met 1921 winner Walter Hagen, who had skipped the event the previous year. Sarazen won in 38 holes for his second consecutive PGA Championship and the third of his seven major titles.

Even in strokes (77) and holes after the morning round, Sarazen was two up with three holes to play, but consecutive  bogeys left them all square and the 36th hole was halved with par fours. Both birdied the first extra hole with fours and the next was a driveable par four, a short downhill dogleg, and both went for the green. Hagen's tee shot was only  from the cup but in a bunker, while Sarazen was in the rough and  out. Hagen failed to exit the sand with his second shot, while Sarazen pitched to four feet (1.2 m) and sank it for a birdie to win. Hagen rebounded and won the next four PGA Championships

Bracket 1

Bracket 2

Bracket 3

Bracket 4

Final four

Final match scorecards
Morning

Afternoon

Extra holes

Source:

References

External links
PGA Media Guide 2012
Results at golfobserver.com 
PGA.com – 1923 PGA Championship

PGA Championship
Golf in New York (state)
PGA Championship
PGA Championship
PGA Championship
PGA Championship